Rick Rivets (born George Fedorcic) was an American guitarist.

In 1971, he and childhood friend Arthur Kane formed a band which, after Rivets was replaced by Sylvain Sylvain, became the New York Dolls, the name provided by the new guitarist.

In 1973 Rivets formed The Brats. The newly-formed Kiss opened for the Brats several times. In 1977, Rivets quit the Brats. He formed the Corpse Grinders with Arthur Kane on bass and their former highschool friend Stuboy Wylder on vocals. Kane left shortly afterwards. In 2006, Rick Rivets released an album called City Rockers, with the Rick Rivets Band. He appears briefly in the movie New York Doll about Arthur Kane.
 
Rivets died on February 19, 2019.

References

External links

New York Doll movie
Rick Rivets Band Official Site

2019 deaths
American punk rock musicians
Year of birth missing